Antisolarium is a genus of sea snails, marine gastropod molluscs in the family Trochidae, the top shells.

Species
Species within the genus Antisolarium include:
 Antisolarium egenum (A. A. Gould, 1849)
Species brought into synonymy
 Antisolarium vixincisum Marwick, 1929: synonym of Conominolia vixincisa (Marwick, 1929)

References

 Powell A. W. B., New Zealand Mollusca, William Collins Publishers Ltd, Auckland, New Zealand 1979 

 
Trochidae
Taxa named by Harold John Finlay